Cheng Shiu University (CSU) is a private university located in Niaosong District, Kaohsiung, Taiwan. CSU offers a wide range of undergraduate and graduate programs across several faculties, including the College of Humanities and Social Sciences, the College of Business, the College of Engineering, and the College of Information and Electrical Engineering.

The university offers a range of international programs, including study abroad opportunities, international internships, and language programs.

History
Established in 1965, it was founded by three friends, Lee Cheng-Sheng (李金盛), Gong Junke, and Zheng Junyuan. It was initially named Cheng-Shiu Junior College of Technology. It became Cheng-Shiu Institute of Technology and Commerce in 1980 after being reorganized and approved by the Ministry of Education. In 1999, it became Cheng Shiu Institute of Technology, and in 2003 it was upgraded to its current name.

Faculties
 College of Engineering
 College of Management
 College of Life and Creativity
 Center for General Education
 Center for Teacher Education

Notable alumni
 Chu Hsing-yu, member of Legislative Yuan (1993–2005)
 Li Mei-jhen, councilor of Kaohsiung City Council

See also
 List of universities in Taiwan

References

External links

 

 
1965 establishments in Taiwan
Educational institutions established in 1965
Universities and colleges in Taiwan
Universities and colleges in Taipei
Technical universities and colleges in Taiwan